Maywood-Melrose Park-Broadview School District 89 is a school district with its headquarters in Melrose Park, Illinois near Chicago, United States. It serves Melrose Park, Maywood, and Broadview. As of 2013 it has 10 schools serving grades Kindergarten through 8, with a total of 5,500 students.

History
In a period of 10 years ending in 2013, the district's student demographics changed from 58.2% black to 59.1% Hispanic due to an influx of Hispanics into Maywood. Michael Robey, the superintendent of the district, stated that Hispanic families bought houses vacated due to the collapse of the United States housing bubble.

As a result of the influx of the Hispanic students, the schools added bilingual and English-learning programs. Robey stated that he hopes to use the new demographics to teach Anglophone students Spanish and Hispanophone students English, characterizing the situation as "a win-win opportunity."

Schools
 Jane Addams Elementary School (Melrose Park)
 Emerson Elementary School (Maywood)
 Garfield Elementary School (Maywood)
 Irving Elementary School (Maywood)
 Lexington Elementary School (Maywood)
 Lincoln Elementary School (Maywood)
 Melrose Park Elementary School (Melrose Park)
 Roosevelt Elementary School (Broadview)
 Stevenson Elementary School (Melrose Park)
 Washington Elementary School (Maywood)

References

External links
 

School districts in Cook County, Illinois